Lord Dawson may refer to:

Bertrand Dawson, 1st Viscount Dawson of Penn (1864–1945), physician to the British Royal Family
Thomas Dawson, Lord Dawson (1948–2007), Scottish judge